Margaret M. Sullivan is an American journalist who is the former media columnist for The Washington Post. She was the fifth public editor of The New York Times and the first woman to hold the position. In that role, she reported directly to Arthur Sulzberger, Jr. as the "readers' representative". She began her tenure on September 1, 2012, joining The New York Times from The Buffalo News, where she had been editor and vice-president. Her first column in The Washington Post ran on May 22, 2016.

Biography
Sullivan is a native of Lackawanna, New York. She is the daughter of John Sullivan, an attorney, and Elaine Saab Sullivan, a department store buyer and school teacher. She graduated from Nardin Academy in Buffalo, where she served as editor in chief of the school newspaper and captain of the basketball team. She is a graduate of Georgetown University. She also holds an M.S.J. from Northwestern University's Medill School of Journalism. Sullivan joined The Buffalo News in 1980 as a summer intern, becoming the paper's first female editor in 1999. In 1985, she married fellow Buffalo News journalist Charles Anzalone.

Sullivan was appointed to the Pulitzer Prize Board in 2011. She has been a juror several times and has served as the chairwoman of the commentary jury in 2006. She has been elected a director of the American Society of News Editors and led its First Amendment committee. Sullivan is also the author of Ghosting the News: Local Journalism and the Crisis of American Democracy, which was published by Columbia Global Reports in 2020, and her memoir, Newroom Confidential: Lessons (and Worries) from an Ink-Stained Life, which was published by St. Martin's Press in 2022.

Career

The Buffalo News
Sullivan was the first woman to serve as the editor and as the managing editor of The Buffalo News, the largest newspaper in Western New York, after previously working as a reporter and columnist. Sullivan focused The Buffalo News's reporting on poverty, economic development and inequities in public education and established its first investigative team.

The New York Times
In the New York Times announcement of Sullivan's appointment on July 16, 2012, former executive editor Jill Abramson said, "Margaret has exactly the right experience to assume this critical role for us at this time. She has an impressive 32-year background in print journalism where she has distinguished herself as a reporter, columnist, editor and manager. And critically for us at this time, she has shown adeptness at embracing new platforms and engaging and interacting with readers in real time online, in print and in person." Unlike previous public editors of The New York Times, Sullivan signed on for four years.

In December 2015, Sullivan announced that she was not renewing her contract with The Times. Sullivan stated that "The role really requires an outsider's perspective, so I've thought all along that having a clear time limit serves The Times and its readers best."

Her tenure was celebrated by both journalists and readers. "Her tenure accomplished many things, most importantly the potential of web-based media reporting and criticism to combat the media establishment's groupthink," Eric Alterman observed.

Washington Post
In February 2016, it was announced that when Sullivan left The Times, she would be joining The Washington Post as its media columnist. Arthur Sulzberger Jr., The Times'''s publisher, praised Sullivan in a memo to staff stating that she had "ushered the position into a new age." Her first column in The Washington Post ran on May 22, 2016. On August 10, 2022, Sullivan announced her departure in memo to staff, calling it a "self-imposed term limit". On the same day, Duke University named Sullivan as their 2023 Egan Visiting professor. Sullivan's final column for The Post was published on August 21, 2022.

Awards 
In 2020, Sullivan was awarded the Mirror Award for her Post'' article on the media coverage of Donald Trump's first impeachment.

References

External links

Washington Post Bio
 

Living people
Duke University faculty
Georgetown University alumni
Medill School of Journalism alumni
People from Lackawanna, New York
The New York Times public editors
The Washington Post columnists
Writers from Buffalo, New York
Year of birth missing (living people)